Victor Asirvatham (25 September 1940 – 11 May 2021) was a Malaysian sprinter. Individually he won bronze medals at the 1965 and 1967 Southeast Asian Peninsular Games. He also competed in the men's 400 metres at the 1968 Summer Olympics. In relay races, he competed in the 4 × 400 metres relay at the 1964 Summer Olympics without reaching the final.

He died on 11 May 2021.

References

External links
 

1940 births
2021 deaths
Athletes (track and field) at the 1964 Summer Olympics
Athletes (track and field) at the 1968 Summer Olympics
Malaysian male sprinters
Olympic athletes of Malaysia
Athletes (track and field) at the 1962 British Empire and Commonwealth Games
Commonwealth Games competitors for Malaya
Athletes (track and field) at the 1962 Asian Games
Athletes (track and field) at the 1966 Asian Games
Athletes (track and field) at the 1970 Asian Games
Asian Games silver medalists for Malaysia
Asian Games bronze medalists for Malaysia
Medalists at the 1962 Asian Games
Medalists at the 1966 Asian Games
Medalists at the 1970 Asian Games
Asian Games medalists in athletics (track and field)
People from Ipoh
Southeast Asian Games medalists in athletics
Southeast Asian Games gold medalists for Malaysia